The Forge and the Crucible is a 1956 book by the Romanian historian of religion Mircea Eliade. It traces historical rites and symbols associated with mines, smiths and other metal workers. An English translation by Stephen Corrin was published in 1962.

Reception
Kirkus Reviews wrote in 1962: "This book, translated from the French, is well documented. Any serious student of man will be well rewarded for the effort expended, and demanded, by this solid exposition of an unusual subject."

References

External links
 French publicity page 
 American publicity page

1956 non-fiction books
French-language books
Romanian books
Works by Mircea Eliade